Carol is used as a female name, Carl or Karl is the male version of the name, although in contemporary Western usage it is more commonly used for females. It is  a European continental spelling of the English Charles, the Germanic Carl, and the Latin Carolus, and can also be a short version of the name Caroline. Spelling variations include Carole. Those named Carol include:

People

Female
 Carol Alt (born 1960), American model and actress
 Carol Remmer Angle (born 1927), American pediatrician, nephrologist, and toxicologist
 Carol Banawa (born 1981), Filipino singer and actress
 Carol Barnett (1956–2021), American businesswoman and philanthropist
 Carol Joyce Blumberg, American statistician
 Carol Breen (born 1986), Irish footballer and Aussie rules player
 Carol Burnett (born 1933), American comedian and actress
 Carol Channing (1921–2019), American singer, actress and comedian
 Carol Corrado, American economist
 Carol A. Gotway Crawford, American mathematical statistician
 Carol Lynn Curchoe (born 1979), American reproductive biologist
 Carol Dartora (born 1983), Brazilian politician, teacher and activist
 Carol Dempster (1901–1991), American actress
 Carol W. Greider (born 1961), American molecular biologist
 Carol Hall, American politician from Connecticut
 Carol Hall (1936–2018), American composer and lyricist
 Carol K. Hall, American chemical engineer
 Carol Harrison (born 1955), British actress and writer
 Carol Higgins Clark (born 1956), American mystery writer, daughter of writer Mary Higgins Clark
 Carol Kane (born 1952), American actress
 Carol Kaye (born 1935), American bass guitarist and session musician
 Carol Kazeem, Pennsylvania State Representative
 Carol Lawrence (born 1932), American actress
 Carol Lewis (born 1963), American track and field long jumper
 Carol Lynley (1942–2019), American actress
 Carol Mann (1941–2018), American golfer
 Carol Mavor, American writer and professor
 Carol Moseley Braun (born 1947), American politician and lawyer, first African-American woman elected to the US Senate
Carol Phiri, South African politician
 Carol Rabadi, Jordanian pilot
 Carol Rhodes (1959–2018), Scottish painter
 Carol Rubin (1945–2001), American film producer
 Carol M. Swain, American political scientist
 Carol Spradling (born 1950), American professor
 Carol Thatcher (born 1953), British journalist, author and media personality, daughter of former British Prime Minister Margaret Thatcher
Carol J. Thiele, American microbiologist and cancer researcher
 Carol Tomcala (born 1954), Australian sports shooter
 Carol Twombly (born 1959), American designer
 Carol Vorderman (born 1960), British television presenter
 Carol Wayne (1942–1985), American actress

Male
 Carol I of Romania (1839–1914), King of Romania
 Carol II of Romania (1893–1953), King of Romania
 Carol Ardeleanu (1883–1949), Romanian writer
 Carol Davila (1828–1884), Romanian physician
 Carol Lambrino (1920–2006), eldest son of Carol II
 Carol Reed (1906–1976), British film director
 Caroll Spinney (1933–2019), American puppeteer, cartoonist, author, artist and speaker
 Carol Szathmari (1812–1887), Austro-Hungarian-born Romanian painter and photographer
 Carol Vadnais (1945–2014), Canadian National Hockey League player
 Carol-Eduard Novak, paralympic cyclist

Fictional characters

 Carol Aird (née Ross), a main character in Patricia Highsmith’s novel The Price of Salt and its film adaptation Carol.
 Carol Beer, in the British comedy sketch series Little Britain
 Carol Brady, the mother in the television series The Brady Bunch, played by Florence Henderson
 Carol Burnett, an airline pilot in seasons four and five of the television series 30 Rock, played by Matt Damon
 Carol Danvers, a Marvel Comics superhero, formerly known as Ms. Marvel, currently known as Captain Marvel
 Carol Anne Freeling, main character in all three Poltergeist film series
 Carol Hathaway, in the television series ER
 Carol Jackson, in the British soap opera EastEnders
 Carol Kester, receptionist in The Bob Newhart Show
 Carol Peletier, in the comic book and television series The Walking Dead
 Carol Post, in the television series Mister Ed
 Carol Tea, in the video game Freedom Planet
 Carol Wetherby, a character in the Christmas film Prancer
 Carol, the Pointy-Haired Boss's secretary in the Dilbert comic strip
 Carol, in the film Where the Wild Things Are

See also

 Carlo (name)
 Carol-Ann Schindel, former Republican member of the Ohio House of Representatives
 Carol-Anne Day (born 1986), Canadian voice actress, actress, and musician
 Carol-Lynn Parente, executive producer of Sesame Street
 Carole King, American songwriter and singer
 Carroll O'Connor, American actor
 Caroline (disambiguation), with many variants
 Karol (name)

Feminine given names
English unisex given names
English feminine given names
Romanian masculine given names